Classical guitar strings are strings manufactured for use on classical guitars. While steel-string acoustic guitar strings and electric guitar strings are made of metal, modern classical guitar strings are made of nylon and nylon wound with wire, which produces a different sound to the metal strings. Classical guitar strings were originally made with animal intestine and silk wound with animal intestine up until World War II, when war restrictions led  Albert Augustine Ltd. to develop nylon strings. Nylon guitar strings were put into production in 1948. Strings made from fluorocarbon polymers have since been developed and are the main alternative to nylon strings.

String construction

Traditional
The three treble guitar strings are made from sheep or cow intestine, referred to as plain gut, while the three bass strings are made of a silk thread core wound with gut.

Modern
Since the development of nylon guitar strings by Albert Augustine Ltd. in 1948, the three treble strings are a single nylon filament, while the three bass strings are made of a core of fine nylon threadlike filaments wound with silver-plated bronze or copper wire.

History
Up until the Second World War animal gut and silk were the materials from which guitar strings were manufactured. Albert Augustine, an instrument maker from New York, USA, was the first to produce guitar strings with nylon. According to Rose Augustine, his wife, he was unable to secure source materials due to the war restrictions and happened upon nylon line in an army surplus store in Greenwich Village. When initially approached by him the DuPont company, who manufactured the material, were unconvinced that guitarists would accept nylon's sonic characteristics. Augustine staged a blind test with company representatives from DuPont, they happened to choose nylon over gut as having the best "guitar sound". The DuPont company then supported Augustine's initiative. Augustine classical guitar strings were first commercially manufactured in 1948, in conjunction with Olinto Mari, President of E.& O. Mari/La Bella Strings at their factory in Long Island City New York. When Andrés Segovia, the great Spanish guitar virtuoso, discovered Augustine's strings he was an immediate convert.

Fluorocarbon polymers have recently become an alternative to nylon treble strings. The sound is preferred by some luthiers and players, especially for the smooth transition provided by the G string from treble to bass.

Notes

External links 

  Tilman Hoppstock - 2006 Interview with lacg (Los Angeles Classical Guitar)
 How to Select the Best Classical Guitar Strings by Tom Prisloe
 The Guitar String Jungle. Are You Judging A Book By The Cover? Article about how guitar strings are marketed, written by Professor String
 ProfessorString.com Guitar string research
 How to Change Classical Guitar Strings video by Strings By Mail
  A quick look at the composition of Strings, Frank Ford, 5/18/00.
 How to Attach a Guitar Strap to a Classical Guitar

Classical guitar
Guitar parts and accessories